Kolonia Chrzanowice  is a settlement in the administrative district of Gmina Gomunice, within Radomsko County, Łódź Voivodeship, in central Poland.

References

Kolonia Chrzanowice